John Raithby (1766–1826), lawyer, born in 1766, was eldest son of Edmund Raithby of Edenham, Lincolnshire. On 26 January 1795 he was admitted a member of Lincoln's Inn, and was subsequently called to the bar. He practised in the Court of Chancery. His legal writings obtained for him a commissionership of bankruptcy; he was also nominated a sub-commissioner on the public records. Raithby died at The Grove, Highgate, on 31 August 1826, leaving a widow.

Raithby published anonymously, in 1798, The Study and Practice of the Law, considered in their various relations to society, 8vo, an ably written treatise, for some time attributed to Sir James Mackintosh. An American edition appeared at Portland, Maine, in 1806, and the second English edition was issued at London in 1816, with the author's name. With Sir Thomas Edlyne Tomlins, Raithby issued a new edition of the Statutes at Large, from Magna Charta to the Union, 41 Geo. III, 10 vols. 4to, 1811 (also in 20 vols. 8vo, 1811). Tomlins co-operated in the edition down to 49 Geo. III, when he relinquished the task to Raithby and Nicholas Simons. Raithby compiled a useful index to the work, "from Magna Charta to 49 Geo. III", which appeared in 1814, in 1 vol. 4to and in 3 vols. 8vo. He likewise compiled alphabetical and chronological indexes to the Statutes of the Realm, which were published by the Record Commission in 1824 and 1828, folio.

Raithby also wrote: The Law and Principle of Money considered, 8vo, London, 1811; and Henry Bennet: a Novel, 3 vols. 12mo, London.

References

1766 births
1826 deaths
Members of Lincoln's Inn
People from Edenham